Banks (Barbados) Breweries Ltd. is a Caribbean brewery founded in 1961 in St. Michael, Barbados.  It is part of the Banks Holdings Limited group.

History
Banks Beer was started as an idea formed by Peter D'Aguiar, a Guyanese entrepreneur.

On September 7, 1961, Banks (Barbados) Breweries opened for business.

In the beginning, the company only produced Banks Beer but by 1963 the company added two other products to its portfolio: Milk Stout and Tiger brand Malt, the latter of which can be found in the Caribbean, South America, Asia, Canada, Europe and the United States.

Banks first began exporting in 1968, with the first two export countries of Saint Vincent and Dominica located nearby.

Banks Beer received its first International Award from the Lager Beer Competition in England in 1971.   The company would continue to win awards through the years.

The company joined with a separate Banks Beer company in Guyana, Banks DIH in 2005, with the intention of exporting the brand as one company abroad, beginning with the United States.

Most recently, Banks Beer has signed an agreement with the LCBO of Canada to start exporting its products to that country as of June 1, 2009.

Availability
The beers are available on the island of Barbados and in many other countries in the Caribbean. The brand is also sold in the United States, Canada and Sweden. According to its website, as of 2012, Banks beer is also currently sold in the United Kingdom.

See also
Banks Sports and Cultural Club
Barbadian companies

References

External links
Official Banks Beer Website

Beer in the Caribbean
Drink companies of Barbados
Barbadian brands
Saint Michael, Barbados
1961 establishments in British Guiana
Food and drink companies established in 1961